Sonyachna is a station on the Kryvyi Rih Metrotram. It opened on 26 December 1986 as part of the first stage of the system.

Geographically Sonyachna is located on a junction of four microraions of the city (Sonyachnyi for which the station is named, Skhidnyi-1,2,3 and Hirnytskyi). It is the last station on the combined track before the metrotram's route splits to the two branches, this makes it the busiest station on the system.

Originally the station was named Zhovtneva after the nearby market (Oktyabrsky Rynok). However, in early 2007, the station was renamed in honour of Hryhoryi Hutovskyi, for the soviet era official and engineer who effectively ensured that the system would be completed. This station in particular was special, as he was handled all the executive work that was associated with its construction. In 2016, the station was finally renamed to Sonyachna

Architecturally, the station presents a large two story structure with the tram lines passing on the upper level, and the vestibule as well as technical compartments located on the lower level. The upper part consists of a concrete cupola-type vault that rests on two rows of supports. Marble is used for the lower side of the support on the interior and gray granite on the platforms. On the apex of each "cupola" is a glazed crown which provides natural lighting during daytime.

Between the supports are large glazed openings, leading to a more common and unofficial local name podlodka (submarine), after the craft that it resembles. As the station has a side-platform arrangement, there are also additional staircases for departure from the platform level on both sides and a subway underneath the station.

External links
 Mir Metro - Description and photos
Google maps - Satellite shot.

Kryvyi Rih Metrotram stations